Ophidiaster granifer, the grained seastar, is a species of starfish in the family Ophidiasteridae. It is found in the Red Sea and the Indo-Pacific and is the only known species of starfish to reproduce by parthenogenesis.

Description
Ophidiaster granifer is a small five armed starfish with a cryptic mottled brown colouration. The disc is quite small and the medium-length, fairly broad arms have rounded tips.

Biology
No male Ophidiaster granifer has ever been identified and all known adults are female. As far as is known, Ophidiaster granifer is the only member of the phylum Echinodermata to reproduce exclusively by parthenogenesis. In this species, eggs are liberated into the sea in a synchronous spawning event but no fertilisation takes place. Here they develop until they undergo metamorphosis into juvenile starfish. Other eggs are planktonic and drift with the currents. In either case, the larvae are lecithotrophic and feed off the yolks of their eggs. This reproductive strategy may be linked to the starfish's low fecundity rate and its low population density.

Distribution and habitat
Ophidiaster granifer is found on coral reefs in shallow waters in the Red Sea and Indo-Pacific Ocean. It is known from the South China Sea, Japan, Tonga, Fiji, Samoa, northern and western Australia, the Great Barrier Reef, New Guinea, Indonesia, the East Indies and the Philippines. It usually hides under boulders and is found on outer reef flats and patch reefs in lagoons, among broken coral rubble and among the dead bases of tangled coral thickets.

References

External links
 

Ophidiasteridae
Animals described in 1871